The Treaty of Mount Dexter was signed between the United States and the Choctaws. The treaty was signed November 16, 1805. The  area ceded was from the Natchez District to the Tombigbee Alabama River watershed, mostly in present-day Mississippi.

Terms

The preamble begins with,

1. Cession to the United States. Reservation.  
2. Consideration.  
3. Payment to certain Indians for past services.  
4. Claim of John M'Grew.  
5. Boundaries.  
6. A certain former grant confirmed.  
7. When to take effect.

Significance
This treaty conveyed large amounts of land in what is now southeastern Mississippi and southwestern Alabama, including much of the western portion of Clarke County, Alabama, to the United States.

In February, 1809, a survey was begun to establish the actual boundary lines between the United States and the Choctaw Nation. The United States
contracted with Silas Dinsmoor and Levin Wailes for this survey.

Signatories

The main signers included James Robertson, Silas Dinsmoor, Pukshunnubbee, Mingo Hoomastubbee, and Pushmataha.

See also

List of Choctaw Treaties
Treaty of Hopewell
Treaty of Fort Adams
Treaty of Fort Confederation
Treaty of Hoe Buckintoopa
Treaty of Fort St. Stephens
Treaty of Doak's Stand
Treaty of Washington City
Treaty of Dancing Rabbit Creek
List of treaties
Choctaw Corner

Citations

External links
Indian Affairs: Laws and Treaties (Treaty with the Choctaw, 1805)

Mount Dexter
1805 treaties
1805 in the United States